Karina (born November 19, 1968, as Cynthia Karina Moreno Elías) is a Peruvian-born Venezuelan Latin pop music singer, songwriter, and actress.

Her first major appearance was in the play El Taller Del Orfebre, in which she sang the song "Zapatos De Tacón Alto."

She became widely known in Latin America with her debut album Amor a Millón, specifically with the hit songs "Se Como Duele" and "A Quién."

Stardom
Amor a Millón was the title of Karina's first album. It was produced by the Venezuelan singer and producer Rudy La Scala, and peaked high on the top ten radio list. She followed it with Sin Mascara in 1987, which confirmed her status as a serious singer not just in Venezuela, but in Mexico, the country that turned out to be her launchpad as a music star. That same year, she was nominated in six categories of the Ronda Music Awards in Venezuela for her previous album, winning Best Female Breakthrough, Best Soap Opera Song ("Sé Como Duele"), Best Videoclip ("A Quién"), Best-Selling Album of the Year ("Amor a Millón"); also, Rudy La Scala (writer and composer of "Sé Como Duele"), won the Best Composer of the Year award. In 1988 Karina had the leading role in the successful telenovela Alba Marina, broadcast by Venevisión, with Xavier Serbiá, Johnny Lozada, and Rene Farrait, then members of Proyecto M and former members of the Puerto Rican band Menudo, and with Venezuelan stars Elluz Peraza and Daniel Alvarado.

That same year she also won two Ronda Music Awards, one for Best Young Female Singer, and another for Best Videoclip ("La Noche es Mágica", composed by the former Mecano member Nacho Cano)

In 1989, she recorded her third album, Desde mi Sueño, which showed her artistic evolution; she made her debut as a composer with "Lamento de La Jungla" and "Soni. The songs "Desde Mi Sueño", "No Puedo Vivir Sin Amor", "En el Amor" and "No Sé" became hits

In 1990, Karina left her music career to pursue other ambitions, although she did participate in the Fiddler on the Roof musical, directed by Michel Hausmann, in the mid-1990s.

Marriage and Family
On June 20, 1998, Karina married Brazilian Jewish entrepreneur Marcello Azevedo in a religious ceremony broadcast by Venevisión. Their daughter Yasha Marcella arrived in January 1999, followed on July 9, 2005 by her sister, Hannah Marcella. In 2016, Karina announced that Xander is a trans boy and that she plans to support him as much as she can.

Four Years Later
Years after her huge success portraying the good girl with the warm smile, she made a comeback on June 13, 2002, declaring to the newspaper Últimas Noticias that she missed singing and acting very much. She also worked as her husband's representative, though she had no previous experience.

In July 2004, she presented her show, "Intimamente Karina", in which she performed acoustic versions of her hits, and that October she recorded the album Siempre Karina, which she expected to return her to all the success she had experienced in the 1980s. The album was introduced gradually in pubs and clubs and officially launched in 2005. It was produced by her husband Azevedo, producer of other Latin American singers like Chayanne and Paulina Rubio. Siempre contained new versions of her hits "Se Como Duele," "Salvame," and "A Quien," plus seven new songs, including "Sin Ti," which was very popular in Latin America. She recently launched another single, "Borrón y Cuenta Nueva."

Comeback
Her return to the stage was on April 30, 2005 at the Lia Bermudez Arts Center in Maracaibo, where she sang for over 90 minutes. Nine months later she returned to Mexico, where she participated as one of the judges-teachers in the Televisa reality show Cantando Por un Sueño. In 2010 she released "De Pie", with all-new songs produced by Marcello Azevedo.

In 2022, she lent her speaking and singing voice to the Disney Channel cartoon, Hamster & Gretel as the villainess La Cebolla. According to a D23 interview, Karina met creator Dan Povenmire on an airplane. Upon hearing his wife was a huge fan of the star, he cast her. For the show, she is credited under the name Karina La Voz.

Discography
1985 Amor a Millón (Sonorodven)
1987 Sin Máscara (Sonorodven)
1988 A Millón (TH-Rodven) (in the US) (#11 Billboard Latin Pop Albums)
1989 Desde Mi Sueño (Rodven Discos)
1993 Esta es Mi Vida (Sonorodven)
1996 Renacer (independent label)
1998 Karina (Caimán Music)
2005 Siempre Karina (Maxximusic Productions)
2009 De Pie (Sonográfica, Maxximusic)
2016–2017 "Tequila y Rosas" Universal Music Mexico.

Singles

External links
fanskarina
 Karina  – Unofficial page
Karina in VenCOR

1968 births
Living people
Jewish musicians
Singers from Lima
Peruvian emigrants to Venezuela
Peruvian Jews
20th-century Venezuelan women singers
Venezuelan telenovela actresses
Venezuelan Jews
Venezuelan pop singers
Venezuelan stage actresses